Siamak is a Persian masculine given name. People with the name include:

People
 Siamak Ansari (born 1968), Iranian actor and director 
 Siamak Atlasi (1936–2021), Iranian actor and director
 Siamak Farahani (born 1977), Iranian football player
 Siamak Ghaderi (born c. 1967), Iranian journalist 
 Siamak Ghahremani (born 1974), Iranian American cultural event producer and radio host
 Siamak Hariri (born 1958), Canadian architect 
 Siamak Koohnavard (born 1984), Iranian football player
 Siamak Kouroshi (born 1989), Iranian football player
 Siamak Namazi (born 1971), Iranian-American businessman
 Siamak Nemati (born 1994), Iranian football player
 Siamak Pourzand (1931–2011), Iranian journalist and film critic
 Siamak Rahimpour (born 1963), Iranian football player
 Siamak Rahpeyk (born 1962), Iranian jurist 
 Siamak Saleh-Farajzadeh, Iranian Paralympic athlete 
 Siamak Sarlak (born 1985), Iranian football player
 Siyamak More Sedgh (born 1965), Jewish Iranian politician and medical doctor
 Siamak Shayeghi (1954–2020), Iranian film director
 Siamak Varzideh (born 1970), Iranian boxer
 Siamak Yasemi (1925–1994), Iranian director, screenwriter, producer, and poet
 Siamak Yassemi, Iranian mathematician and academic
 Syamak Zafarzadeh (born 1964), Iranian cyclist

Fictional characters
 Siamak, character in the epic poem Shahnameh written by Ferdowsi
 Siamak Mustafai, one of the main characters in the 2005 movie Fremde Haut

Persian masculine given names